Dyssegård station is a station on the Farum radial of the S-train network in Copenhagen, Denmark.

History
The station opened on 22 May 1932. In March 2014, the Danish Traffic Agency (Trafikstyrelsen) proposed a closure of the station as a result of its relatively low passenger numbers.

See also
 List of railway stations in Denmark

References

External links

S-train (Copenhagen) stations
Railway stations opened in 1932
Railway stations in Denmark opened in the 20th century